John Mackay Wilson (15 August 1804 – 2 October 1835) was a Scottish writer famous for the eponymous "Wilson's Tales of The Borders (and of Scotland)"  He was born in Tweedmouth, on the border between Scotland and England. He gave many talks to Temperance societies.

Whilst editor of the Berwick Advertiser, Wilson began publishing local stories.  Their popularity led to him reprinting and extending them into a weekly broadsheet, priced at 1 1/2d (a penny halfpenny) Although he died within a year, with his obituary published in issue 49, the Tales ran to 312 editions, in all carrying 485 tales or serialisations.  After his death the Tales continued under the editorship of others, in part to provide income for his widow and family.  The most notable contributor and subsequent editor being Alexander Leighton.

As well as editing the newspaper, Wilson also wrote poetry and plays.   The Wilson's Tales Project now hosts a literary dinner on the anniversary of his death, at which his poem 'Beans and Bacon' is performed.  The circumstances and penury of the central character of the poem are generally regarded as being semi autobiographical

It is likely Wilson died of an embolism.

His plays include The Gowrie Conspiracy and Margaret of Anjou.

Sources
British Listed Buildings – Gravestone of John Mackay Wilson
National Library of New Zealand

Notes

External links
Wilson's Tales   Life and work
John Mackay Wilson from Myers Literary Guide to North-East England
 
 

1804 births
1835 deaths
19th-century Scottish writers
Scottish dramatists and playwrights
19th-century Scottish dramatists and playwrights